Forestier is a French-language surname meaning "forester". Notable people with the surname include:
 Amédée Forestier
 Jacques Forestier
 Jean Forestier
 Jean-Claude Nicolas Forestier
 Louise Forestier
 Mathurin Forestier
 Maxime Le Forestier
 Sara Forestier

See also
 Alfred Masson-Forestier
 Sir Leolin Forestier-Walker, 1st Baronet
 Forestier-Walker baronets
 Diffuse idiopathic skeletal hyperostosis, also called Forestier's disease
 Forester

French-language surnames
Occupational surnames